Radio IFM ; is a private Tunisian radio station broadcasting on the FM band since November 4, 2011. Founded by Hamed Soyah, it is the country's first radio station on the theme of “laughter and music” its programming thus alternates sketches and songs.

References

Radio stations in Tunisia
Mass media in Tunis
Radio stations established in 2011
2011 establishments in Tunisia